INS Rana is a  in active service with the Indian Navy. She was commissioned on 28 June 1982.

She was the only ship of her class which was not upgraded like the other two remaining ships earlier with Israeli Barak 1 and EL/M-2238 STAR Radar. 
A upgrade in 2022 armed her with new short range SAM VL-SRSAM in VLS configuration of 8 x 2 cells replacing one S-125 Neva/Pechora launcher in the Aft.

Service history
INS Rana serves in the Eastern Fleet of the Indian Navy. Her home port is Visakhapatnam.

With , she made a call at Qingdao Port, PRC in mid-April 2007.

Later that month she visited Manila, Philippines.

From 5–6 June 2010, she made a friendly visit to Fremantle, Australia to enhance bilateral cooperation between the Indian and Australian navies.

Vice admiral Karambir Singh, Flag Officer Commanding in Chief of Eastern Naval Command, who assumed duty as the 24th Chief of the Naval Staff (India), after Admiral Sunil Lanba, on 31 May 2019, had sea commands of Guided Missile Destroyers INS Rana and INS Delhi (D61).

South China Sea and the North West Pacific 
This battle group was under the command of Rear Admiral Ajit Kumar P, Flag Officer Commanding, Eastern Naval Command. According to the Ministry of Defence, the two-month deployment, far from India's usual area of operations, along with naval exercises with a number of countries, aimed to demonstrate the Indian navy's operational reach.

During the deployment the battle group participated in passage exercises with the navies of the countries visited. The 'passage exercises' focussed on maritime security cooperation, which included humanitarian aid & disaster relief operations and 'visit, board, search and seizure' (VBSS) drills for anti-piracy operations. These exercises aimed to increase naval inter-operability, enabling the two navies to function together smoothly during possible disaster-relief operations. In addition, during the port visits, the fleet commander along with the commanding officers of the ships met high-ranking officials of the navy, state administration, port management, coastal security organization, police, and other stakeholders of maritime security in the countries visited, to share professional experiences and exchange
best practices in areas of mutual interest.

JIMEX 2012 
The ship was deployed in the North West Pacific for JIMEX 2012 (Japan-India Maritime Exercise) with the four ship group, and took part in India's first bi-lateral maritime exercise with Japan. The Japanese Maritime Self-Defence Force (JMSDF) was represented by two destroyers, one maritime patrol aircraft and a helicopter.

The four ships entered Tokyo on 5 June after visiting Singapore, Vietnam, Philippines and Republic of Korea. They stayed in Tokyo for 3 days. This visit coincided with commemoration of 60 years of diplomatic relations between India and Japan. Then Vice Admiral Anil Chopra, Flag Officer Commanding-in-Chief Eastern Naval Command also visited Tokyo to witness the first JIMEX.

Southeast Asia 
After the deployment in the North Pacific, the battle group was deployed in the South China Sea. As part of India's Look East policy, the ships visited the Shanghai port on 13 June 2012, for a five-day goodwill tour. Shakti served as the fuel and logistics tanker to the three destroyers. The ships left the port on 17 June 2012. Before leaving the port, the ships conducted routine passage exercise with the People's Liberation Army Navy.

After the visits to Singapore, Vietnam, Philippines, Japan, South Korea and China, the ships visited Port Klang, Malaysia. This was the last port call of the battle group, after which it returned to the Eastern fleet of the Indian Navy, after being on a two-month-long deployment which started in May 2012.

Controversy
On Thursday, 1 June 2017, a 21-year-old naval sailor, Vikash Yadav, of Bhind, Madhya Pradesh, an electrical mechanic of power class 1, was found dead at 5 am, with bullet injuries, on board the INS Rana in Visakhapatnam, while on duty as security sentry. A formal inquiry was ordered by the Indian Navy and case registered with the Malkapuram police.

References

Rajput-class destroyers
Ships built in the Soviet Union
1978 ships
Destroyers of India
Destroyers of the Cold War